Trémentines is a commune in the Maine-et-Loire department in western France. The musicologist Jean-Pierre Ouvrard (1948–1992) was born in Trémentines.

Geography
The commune is traversed by the Èvre river.

See also
Communes of the Maine-et-Loire department

References 

Communes of Maine-et-Loire